The 1984 World Rowing Championships were World Rowing Championships that were held on 26 August 1984 in Montreal, Quebec, Canada. Since 1984 was an Olympic year for rowing, the World Championships did not include Olympic events scheduled for the 1984 Summer Olympics.

Medal summary

Medalists at the 1984 World Rowing Championships were:

Men's lightweight events

Women's lightweight events

References

Rowing competitions in Canada
World Rowing Championships
World Rowing Championships
1984 in Quebec
1984 in Canadian sports
Rowing
Rowing